One Eight Seven (also known as 187) is a 1997 American crime thriller film directed by Kevin Reynolds. It was the first top-billed starring role for Samuel L. Jackson, who plays a Los Angeles teacher caught with gang trouble in an urban high school. The film's name comes from the California Penal Code Section 187, which defines murder.

The original screenplay was written in 1995 by Scott Yagemann, a Los Angeles area high school substitute teacher for seven years. He wrote the screenplay after an incident when a violent transfer student had threatened to kill him and his family. Yagemann reported the threat to the authorities and the student was arrested. About a week later, he was called by the district attorney to testify against the student in a court of law, where the student was being prosecuted for stabbing a teacher's aide a year before. This annoyed Yagemann, who had not been told about it beforehand, and led to him writing the screenplay. He claimed that 90% of the film's material is based on incidents that had happened to him and other teachers in real life.

Plot
Trevor Garfield is a high school science teacher in Brooklyn. Dennis Broadway, a gangster student to whom he had given a failing grade threatens to murder him, writing the number 187 (the police code for homicide) on every page in a textbook. Garfield reports his concerns to the administration, who ignores Garfield's warning. Soon afterwards, Dennis ambushes Garfield in the school hallway, stabbing him in the back and side multiple times with a shiv.

Garfield survives and is shown resuming his teaching career as a substitute teacher fifteen months later. He relocates to the San Fernando Valley area of Los Angeles, but is assigned to another class of unruly students, including a Chicano tag crew by the name of "Kappin' Off Suckers" (K.O.S.). Their leader, Benny Chacón, a felon attending high school as a condition of probation, makes it clear to Garfield that there will be no mutual respect.

Tension mounts when another teacher, Ellen Henry, confides that Benny has also threatened her life, an action against which the administration of the school refuses to take action as they fear the threat of legal action. After Benny murders a rival tagger in cold blood, he disappears, and Benny's unstable tag partner, César Sanchez takes over as leader. César embarks on a campaign of intimidation against Garfield which is started by the theft of Garfield's watch. Garfield reports this to the principal who declines to act due to fear of a lawsuit by César. Garfield finds out the combination to César's locker and retrieves his watch. He shows César that he recovered it and suggests that they start over, which César declines to do.

César amps up the conflict between Garfield and the K.O.S. by killing Jack, Ellen's dog. Later after spraying cartoon graffiti depicting a dead dog, César is shot with a syringe filled with morphine attached to the end of an arrow. He passes out and wakes up to find one of his fingers removed. Upon finding the finger, César finds the letters "R U DUN" ("are you done?") tattooed as a warning.

Later Garfield witnesses Rita Martínez, a student he is tutoring, facing abuse from the K.O.S. Rita drops out of school to escape the abuse. Garfield is eventually fired after administrators find out that he had Rita over to his house for a tutoring session.

Benny's dead body is discovered in the Los Angeles River. César and the K.O.S. believe Garfield to be responsible for the killing. César and the K.O.S., inspired by the film The Deer Hunter trap Garfield at his home and get him to confess to killing Benny and cutting off César's finger. They force Garfield into a contest of Russian roulette with César. César, in a machismo mode, loads the revolver with two bullets. After each round, Garfield talks about the lost-cause lifestyle César has led. Garfield, on the penultimate round, takes his turn and survives. Instead of handing the weapon to César, Garfield takes the next turn, and the weapon goes off; killing Garfield instantly. Driven by his sense of honor and enraged over the failure of his revenge, César insists on taking his rightful turn against the protests of his horrified friends and ends up killing himself.

On graduation day, Rita is shown to have completed her studies and successfully graduated along with the now former K.O.S. member Stevie, who is filled with remorse and feels disillusioned with the gang life. Rita offers a tribute to Garfield by reading an essay about him. The essay incorporates the theme of the pyrrhic victory. A heartbroken Ellen leaves the school.

The closing narration cites a 1994 MetLife-Louis Harris Survey stating one in nine teachers has been attacked in school and 95 percent of those attacks were committed by students, as well as the movie being written by a teacher.

Cast
 Samuel L. Jackson as Trevor Garfield
 John Heard as Dave Childress
 Kelly Rowan as Ellen Henry
 Clifton Collins Jr. as César Sánchez
 Tony Plana as Principal García
 Karina Arroyave as Rita Martínez
 Demetrius Navarro as Paco
 Lobo Sebastian as Benito "Benny" Chacón
 Jack Kehler as Larry Hyland
 Jonah Rooney as Stevie Littleton
 Method Man as Dennis Broadway
 Kathryn Leigh Scott as Anglo Woman

Reception
On Rotten Tomatoes the film has an approval rating of 30% based on reviews from 27 critics.

Roger Ebert rated the film 2 out of 4 stars, complimenting the "strong and sympathetic performance" by Samuel L. Jackson and saying that the movie "has elements that are thoughtful and tough about inner-city schools" but it also contains "elements that belong in a crime thriller or a war movie". He also felt that the movie's "destination doesn't have much to do with how it got there".

The film grossed $5.7 million domestically in its theatrical release.

Soundtrack

The film's soundtrack was released under the title Music from the Motion Picture 187 on July 29, 1997 through Atlantic Records. Unlike films like Dangerous Minds and The Substitute that dealt with similar subject matter, this soundtrack did not receive an urban music soundtrack. Instead the soundtrack was made up of trip hop, a combination of hip hop and electronica.

 Track listing

See also 

 List of hood films

References

Further reading
 Bernstein, Nell. (Archive, Archive) Salon.com. August 6, 1997. - Review of the film
 Fassett, Deanna L.; Warren, John T. "A Teacher Wrote This Movie": Challenging the Myths of "One Eight Seven" [movie review]. Multicultural Education, v7 n1 p30-33 Fall 1999. ISSN . ERIC Number: EJ594392 - Information at ERIC

External links
 
 
 
 Interview with Scott Yagemann, the creator

1997 films
1990s crime drama films
Films about educators
Hood films
Icon Productions films
1990s Spanish-language films
Warner Bros. films
Films directed by Kevin Reynolds
Films produced by Bruce Davey
Films scored by Michael Stearns
American crime drama films
Films set in New York City
Films set in Los Angeles
1997 drama films
1990s English-language films
1990s American films